The Jackson County Monument, in Edna, Texas, was listed on the National Register of Historic Places in 2018.

It is located on the grounds of the Jackson County Courthouse.

It was designed by architects Page & Southerland and sculptor Raoul Josset.

References

		
National Register of Historic Places in Jackson County, Texas
Monuments and memorials in Texas
Buildings and structures completed in 1936
Texas Revolution monuments and memorials
History of Texas